Tache Papahagi (October 20, 1892 – January 17, 1977) was an Aromanian folklorist and linguist.

He was born into an Aromanian family in Avdella, a village that formed part of the Ottoman Empire's Manastir Vilayet and is now in Greece. He attended primary school in his native village, followed from 1902 to 1912 by studies at the Romanian high schools in Ioannina and Bitola. From 1912 to 1916, he went to the literature and philosophy faculty of the University of Bucharest in Romania. In 1925, he obtained a doctorate in philology from the same institution; his thesis dealt with the Maramureș dialect and folklore. He was a high school teacher at Târgu Neamț from 1916 to 1918. Papahagi was then hired at his alma mater, where he rose from teaching assistant (1920–1925) to docent (1926–1928), associate professor (1928–1943) and full professor (1943–1948).

His first book was a printed conference report, the 1915 . In 1927, he started a course on Romanian linguistic ethnography, the first of its kind. His research was consistently interdisciplinary, combining ethnography, folklore and dialectology, and analyzing phenomena from comparatist, Romance and Balkan perspectives. A good part of his work dealt with the literary, folk and religious corpus in the Aromanian language, and was aimed at making it known and emphasizing its value. His studies of ethnography and folklore (among them , vol. Papahagi held numerous university courses on linguistics, ethnography and folklore, many of which were printed. In 1964, the year he became an emeritus professor, he was granted the State Prize.

See also
 Pericle Papahagi

Notes

1892 births
1977 deaths
People from Avdella
Aromanians from the Ottoman Empire
Romanian people of Aromanian descent
Emigrants from the Ottoman Empire to Romania
University of Bucharest alumni
Academic staff of the University of Bucharest
Romanian ethnographers
Romanian folklorists
Aromanian schoolteachers
Romanian schoolteachers
Aromanian linguists
Linguists from Romania
20th-century linguists